Jamia Suzette "Jayma" Mays is an American actress. She is known for playing Emma Pillsbury in the Fox musical series Glee (2009–2015) and for her starring roles in the films Red Eye (2005), Paul Blart: Mall Cop (2009) and The Smurfs (2011). She is also known for portraying Debbie in the sitcom The Millers (2013–2014) and her recurring role as Charlie Andrews on the NBC sci-fi series Heroes (2006–2010). Mays starred as prosecutor Carol Anne Keane in the NBC sitcom Trial & Error (2017–2018).

Early life
Mays was raised in Grundy, Virginia, the daughter of Susan Paulette (née Norris) and James Edwin Mays, a high school teacher who also worked in the coal mining industry. At age 15, she was offered a job working on the local radio station reading the obituaries. After graduating from Grundy High School, she earned an associate degree from Southwest Virginia Community College. Mays then attended Virginia Tech for a year before transferring to Radford University.

Career

In 2004, Mays made her first television appearance on Joey. The following year, she made her feature film debut with a supporting role in Red Eye. Mays' other credits include Six Feet Under, Stacked, How I Met Your Mother, Heroes, Pushing Daisies, The Comeback, Entourage, Ghost Whisperer, and Ugly Betty.

Mays appeared in other movies, such as Bar Starz, Flags of Our Fathers and Blind Guy Driving. She starred in the spoof film Epic Movie and as Amy in Paul Blart: Mall Cop. She was a patient on House in the episode "Sleeping Dogs Lie" in 2006.
Mays has played the love interest of a character played by Masi Oka in two different roles: Charlie Andrews on Heroes and Nina in the direct-to-DVD film Get Smart's Bruce and Lloyd: Out of Control. She has also been cast as a love interest twice for Glee co-star Matthew Morrison; in an unaired TV show called Nice Girls Don't Get the Corner Office, and as mysophobic guidance counsellor Emma Pillsbury on the Fox show Glee, which premiered on May 19, 2009. She was part of the main cast of Glee for the first three seasons, then was made a guest star in seasons four, five, and six. She has also performed musical numbers on Glee including her solo performance of "Touch-a, Touch-a, Touch-a Touch Me" from The Rocky Horror Show during the themed episode "The Rocky Horror Glee Show"; which was also the song she had sung for her audition for the role. In March 2010, Mays played Grace Winslow, the female lead in the live-action/animated film adaptation of The Smurfs. She also played the role of Charlotte, Henry Grubstick's ex-girlfriend on Ugly Betty. In August 2014, Mays helped to raise awareness of the disease ALS by participating in the Ice Bucket Challenge. She also appeared in the music video for Switchfoot's single "Awakening".

From 2017–2018, Mays starred in the NBC crime anthology comedy Trial & Error as prosecutor Carol Anne Keane. She also appeared in a 2018 episode of Great News as Cat, the girlfriend of Greg, played by Mays's husband Adam Campbell.

In April 2021, it was announced that Mays was cast in Disenchanted, the long-awaited sequel to the 2007 film Enchanted, along with Maya Rudolph and Yvette Nicole Brown.

Personal life
Mays met her husband Adam Campbell on the set of Epic Movie in 2006. She gave birth to their son in August 2016.

Filmography

Film

Television

Music videos

References

External links

Living people
21st-century American actresses
Actresses from Tennessee
Actresses from Virginia
American voice actresses
American film actresses
American television actresses
Singers from Virginia
People from Grundy, Virginia
Radford University alumni
Virginia Tech alumni
21st-century American singers
21st-century American women singers
Year of birth missing (living people)